India competed at the 2022 Commonwealth Games at Birmingham, England from 28 July to 8 August 2022. It was India's 18th appearance at the Commonwealth Games.

In July 2022, the Indian team of 106 men and 104 women competing in 16 sports was named. India did not compete in 3x3 basketball, beach volleyball, netball and rugby sevens. Indian para-athletes competed in athletics, para powerlifting, swimming and table tennis.

Hockey player Manpreet Singh and badminton athlete P. V. Sindhu served as the country's opening ceremony flagbearers.
Squash player Anahat Singh became the youngest Indian athlete to compete at the Commonwealth Games at just 14 years of age. 45-year old Lawn Bowls player Sunil Bahadur was the oldest player in the contingent.

India's first medal of the Games was won by Sanket Sargar with a silver in weightlifting. Saikhom Mirabai Chanu won the first gold medal for the country, also in weightlifting. India won its first ever medals in Lawn Bowls after the Women's Fours team won the Gold medal, and were followed by the Men's fours team winning a silver medal. Sharath Kamal was India's most successful player at the Games, having won four (3 gold and 1 silver) medals in table tennis.

India ended the games as the best nation in 4 sports: badminton, table tennis, wrestling and weightlifting and second best in boxing.

Withdrawal threat
Following a June 2019 decision by the Commonwealth Games Federation Executive Board to back BOCCG's proposal that archery and shooting not be included in the 2022 sport programme, IOA President Narinder Batra proposed that India boycott the 2022 Games, claiming the CGF leadership had an "India bashing mindset" and that "people with a particular mindset" could not tolerate India's sporting prowess (of which shooting sports constitute a significant portion).

However, the IOA later withdrew its boycott threat and proposed the hosting of a combined archery and shooting championships, scheduled to take place in Chandigarh during January 2022. The proposal was backed by associated stakeholders and subsequently received official approval on the proviso that India bore the cost of hosting the event; medals awarded in Chandigarh would be included in the 2022 Games overall medal table a week after the closing ceremony. In July 2021, the event was cancelled due to the COVID-19 pandemic.

In October 2021, Hockey India withdrew both hockey teams from the Games, citing the pandemic within the United Kingdom and the proximity of Birmingham 2022 to the 2022 Asian Games (with Paris 2024 Olympic qualification at stake in the latter); the decision was made in response to the UK's non-recognition of Indian COVID-19 vaccination certificates and England Hockey withdrawing from the 2021 Men's FIH Hockey Junior World Cup in Bhubaneswar. Following discussions with the IOA and Sports Minister Anurag Thakur, the federation determined that India would, subject to qualification, participate in the Commonwealth hockey tournaments.

Competitors
The following is the list of number of competitors participating at the Games per sport/discipline.

Medalists

| style="text-align:left; vertical-align:top;"|

|  style="text-align:left; vertical-align:top;"|

|

Athletics 

Following the National Inter-State Athletics Championships in Chennai, a squad of thirty-seven athletes was selected on 16 June 2022.

Men
Track & road events

Field events

Women
Track & road events

Field events

Badminton

By virtue of its position in the combined BWF World Ranking (as of 1 February 2022), India qualified for the mixed team event. Following the Senior Selection Trials, a full squad of ten players was selected on 20 April 2022.

Singles

Doubles

Mixed team

Summary

Squad

Srikanth Kidambi
Satwiksairaj Rankireddy
B. Sumeeth Reddy
Lakshya Sen
Chirag Shetty
Gayatri Gopichand
Treesa Jolly
Aakarshi Kashyap
Ashwini Ponnappa
P. V. Sindhu

Group stage

Quarter Finals

Semi Finals

Final

Boxing

Following the men's selection trials on 2 June 2022, eight boxers were selected for the competition. The women's trials and selection of four more boxers followed on 11 June 2022.

Men

Women

Cricket

By virtue of its position in the ICC Women's T20I rankings (as of 1 April 2021), India qualified for the tournament.

Fixtures were announced in November 2021.

Summary

Roster
Fifteen players were officially selected on 11 July 2022.

 Harmanpreet Kaur (c)
 Smriti Mandhana (vc)
 Taniya Bhatia (wk)
 Yastika Bhatia (wk)
 Harleen Deol
 Rajeshwari Gayakwad
 Sabbhineni Meghana
 Sneh Rana
 Jemimah Rodrigues
 Deepti Sharma
 Meghna Singh
 Renuka Singh
 Pooja Vastrakar
 Shafali Verma
 Radha Yadav

Reserves: Simran Bahadur, Richa Ghosh, Poonam Yadav

Group play

Semi-final

Gold medal match

Cycling

Thirteen cyclists (9 men and 4 women) have been officially selected to represent India at CWG 2022.

Track
Sprint

Keirin

Time trial

Pursuit

Points race

Scratch race

Gymnastics

Artistic
Men
Team Final & Individual Qualification

Individual Finals

Women
Team Final & Individual Qualification

Individual events

Rhythmic
Individual Qualification

Hockey

By virtue of its position in the FIH World Rankings for men and women respectively (as of 1 February 2022), India qualified for both tournaments. Detailed fixtures were released on 9 March 2022.

Hockey India originally sought to send reserve squads to the Commonwealth Games; this was so the primary squads could focus on the Asian Games tournaments and attempt to qualify for the 2024 Summer Olympics at the first opportunity. Owing to the subsequent postponement of the 2022 Asian Games, a full-strength men's squad for the Commonwealth Games was confirmed on 20 June 2022; an experienced women's squad was also confirmed on 23 June 2022.

Summary

Men's tournament

Roster

P. R. Sreejesh (gk)
Krishan Pathak (gk)
Varun Kumar
Surender Kumar
Harmanpreet Singh (vc)
Amit Rohidas
Jugraj Singh
Jarmanpreet Singh
Manpreet Singh (c)
Hardik Singh
Vivek Prasad
Shamsher Singh
Akashdeep Singh
Nilakanta Sharma
Mandeep Singh
Gurjant Singh
Lalit Upadhyay
Abhishek

Group play

Semi Final

Gold medal match

Women's tournament

Roster

Savita Punia (c, gk)
Rajani Etimarpu (gk)
Deep Grace Ekka (vc)
Gurjit Kaur
Nikki Pradhan
Udita Duhan
Nisha Warsi
Sushila Chanu
Monika Malik
Neha Goyal
Jyoti
Sonika Tandi
Salima Tete
Vandana Katariya
Lalremsiami
Navneet Kaur
Sharmila Devi
Sangita Kumari

Group play

Semi Final

Bronze medal match

Judo

India announced a six-member judo team following selection trials held from May 23 to May 26.

Men

Women

Lawn bowls

Men

Women

Para powerlifting

Squash

As of 12 July 2022, a team of 9 athletes will represent India in the squash competition at the Games.

Singles

Doubles

Swimming

India declared its four-member swimming team on 25 June 2022.

Men

Table tennis

India qualified for both the men's and women's team events via the ITTF World Team Rankings (as of 2 January 2020). Seven players were selected on 31 May 2022; the women's selections were provisional and dependent on SAI approval since Archana Kamath was selected even though she did not satisfy the selection criteria.

The SAI returned responsibility for the decision back to the Committee of Administrators; Diya Chitale, who filed a writ petition to the Delhi High Court protesting her non-selection, replaced Kamath in the amended squad. Another player was also added to the men's squad.

Singles

Para-Singles

Doubles

Team

Triathlon

A squad of four triathletes (two per gender) was selected for the competition; the men will be named at a later date.

Individual

Mixed Relay

Weightlifting

A squad of 15 weightlifters was confirmed on 13 April 2022.

Jeremy Lalrinnunga, Achinta Sheuli, Ajay Singh and Purnima Pandey qualified for the competition by winning gold at the 2021 Commonwealth Weightlifting Championships in Tashkent, Uzbekistan. The other 11 qualified via the IWF Commonwealth Ranking List, which was finalised on 9 March 2022.

Men

Women

Wrestling

Following the women's selection trials on 16 May 2022, six wrestlers were selected for the competition. The men's trials and selection of six more wrestlers followed on 17 May 2022.

Men

Women

Group stage Format

Nordic Format

Repechage Format

See also
India at the 2022 Winter Olympics
India at the 2022 Asian Games

Notes

References

External links
Indian Olympic Association Official site

Nations at the 2022 Commonwealth Games
India at the Commonwealth Games
2022 in Indian sport